Wanquyru (Quechua for bee, hispanicized spelling Huanguyro) is a mountain in the Andes of Peru, about  high. It is located in the Lima Region, Oyón Province, Oyón District. Wanquyru lies at the Puka Yaku valley, southwest of Quyllur.

References

Mountains of Peru
Mountains of Lima Region